Phineas and Ferb  (also known as Phineas and Ferb: The Video Game)  is an action platform video game published by Disney Interactive Studios about the animated television series of the same name for the Nintendo DS, and developed by Altron. The game was released in North America on February 3, 2009, its United Kingdom release was on March 23 and its Australian release on September 23.

The game's plot is similar to the show, as the player controls Phineas Flynn and his stepbrother Ferb Fletcher as they take part in several schemes and adventures for their summer vacation. The two as well attempt to avoid their sister Candace, who is persistent in trying to "bust" them. Mini games are scattered throughout the game, building up the side foundation.

The game was not affiliated with the creators of the show itself, Dan Povenmire and Jeff "Swampy" Marsh. The two had little to no information on it until its release. The game as well features an in-between mini game, featuring Perry the Platypus fighting and foiling the plans of Dr. Heinz Doofenshmirtz, an evil mad scientist.

Gameplay
The game's each, individual seven levels are based on an episode of the television series. The first stage of the game consists of Phineas and Ferb beginning their plans to destroy and construct a giant roller coaster. Phineas primarily is the one in his duo to actually find and gather the tools and objects necessary for it, while Ferb primarily is used to actually utilize each device. The two need to avoid their sister, Candace, as she is persistent in her desire to bust them and get them in trouble with their mom. Once every part in the needed list is found, the two construct the devices in the form of little puzzles which end with the creation of roller coaster tracks and engines. Once everything has been completed, the two race in the roller coaster down the tracks to compete. Throughout their way, they as well build other devices, from a water slide to a winter wonderland, and occasionally bump into the neighborhood bully, Buford. After constructing all 5 rides in the game, Candace prepares her ultimate busting attack, after which Phineas remarks "Hey, where's Perry?" You suddenly find yourself playing as Perry the Platypus fighting in Doofenshmirtz Evil Inc, the player using the Touch Screen to help Perry fight Doof. After Perry's final attack, the resulting explosion obliterates all the rides Phineas and Ferb have made throughout the game, right as Candace drags her Mom into the backyard. Phineas and Ferb, not knowing what just happened, build a time machine and send themselves back to before the rides were destroyed.

Development
The game was inspired by the top-rated Disney animated series Phineas and Ferb, which was created by Dan Povenmire and Jeff "Swampy" Marsh. The series was inspired by Povenmire's youth growing up in Mobile, Alabama, where his mother encouraged him to go out and do projects. He met and befriended Marsh while working on The Simpsons, later moving on with him to work on Rocko's Modern Life, where they initially created the series. Years later, the two pitched it and got it on Disney Channel.

The game itself was published by Disney Interactive Studios. Altron, a Japanese private game developer and publisher, developed the game. The game had no actual connection with the show creators; Povenmire knew almost nothing about the game until he was given it himself. Phineas and Ferb makes use of a program known as DGamer, which allows the player to connect to an online community via the Nintendo Wi-Fi connection. This was a large part of marketing the game during release and apparently was a key part to development.

Release and reception

The game's reviews have been generally positive. GameRankings averages a 76.67% approval ratings, based on a cast of ratings. Among them include eight out of ten and seventy-eight out of one hundred. GameTrailers gives it a 1.0 due to the lack of actual reviews, though the European trailer ranks an average of 4.1. It as well puts it as number 5,420 out of the total games of 8,005, while it is 860 out of the total 932 of DS games. GameFly ranks it a 6.6 based on 166 ratings.

Chad Sapieha states in his review on Common Sense Media that the game is "fine entertainment for elementary school kids". He as well states the interaction is entertaining. He does, however, say that the rides that take a great amount of time to construct are very anticlimactic and the weakest part of the game, as well as the controls being stiff. Even so, he states it is "undeniably an above-average interactive incarnation of a kids cartoon".

Sequel
The second Phineas and Ferb video game was released on the Nintendo DS on September 14, 2010, called Phineas and Ferb: Ride Again. A video game based on the TV movie was released on August 2, 2011 for DS, Wii, and PlayStation 3. Phineas and Ferb: Quest for Cool Stuff was released on August 13, 2013 for DS, Wii, 3DS, Wii U and Xbox 360. Phineas and Ferb: Day of Doofenshmirtz was released for PlayStation Vita on November 10, 2015.

References

External links
Official Phineas and Ferb website
 

Video game
2009 video games
Altron games
Nintendo DS games
Nintendo DS-only games
Disney video games
Video games developed in Japan
Works about vacationing
Single-player video games